Tripura Medical College & Dr. B.R. Ambedkar Memorial Teaching Hospital or TMC is a State Government Medical College (run by government's society SFTMC " Society For TMC"). The society was formed by Tripura government. TMC is located in the capital town of Tripura, Agartala, India. The college operates the hospital known as Dr. B. R. Ambedkar Memorial Teaching Hospital (previously district hospital.)  within the campus.  The campus is located at Hapania under Bishalgarh sub-division of west Tripura district.

History

The college was established in 2005 by the Government of Tripura and Global Educational Net (GENET) in a Public-Private Partnership, the first venture of its kind in India. But it received its first MCI permission for admission of students into M.B.B.S. course in 2006. However, during the month of April–May 2009, due to some reasons the GENET expressed their inability to run the institution any further. At that time 200 students were pursuing the M.B.B.S course from there. So, the Government of Tripura decided to run the college through a society and registered a society in the name and style of " Society for Tripura Medical College" on 23 May 2009.

Campus
The college is spread over an area of 31 acres (approx.). The college has a 600-bed hospital with various facilities like NICU, PICU, ICU, ICCU, and Burn Unit, Blood-bank. It has a 24-hour emergency service. The academic building is complete with all the Pre-clinical and Para-clinical departments with well-equipped laboratory and departmental museums and the Principals Office and the Central Library. There are many other buildings coming up in the campus like the new OPD block with all modern facilities and expectedly the first of its kind in North-east India, the auditorium building is noteworthy.

Organisation and administration

Departments
The college has the following departments

Anatomy
Physiology
Biochemistry
Pathology
Microbiology
Pharmacology
Forensic Medicine
Community Medicine
ENT
Ophthalmology
Medicine
Surgery
Obstetrics & Gynaecology
Pediatrics
Psychiatry
Anesthesiology
Radiodiagnosis
Tuberculosis & Respiratory Diseases (Chest Medicine)
Dentistry
Dermatology, STD & Leprosy
Orthopaedics & Physical Medicine and Rehabilitation

Super Specialty Departments

The college runs various Super Specialty departments like
Endocrinology, 
Neurology, 
Neurosurgery,
Urology and 
Plastic & Cosmetic Surgery.

Academics

Admission 

The college has an annual intake of 100 students for the MBBS course out of which 20 seats are reserved for All India Quota NEET National Eligibility cum Entrance Test (Undergraduate).

Affiliation 
The college is affiliated to Tripura University, a central university. The college is recognized by the Medical Council of India and Government of India and the college is also enlisted in the International Medical Education Directory (IMED).

Post-Graduation
The college has started post-graduation courses (MD/MS) permitted u/s 10A of the IMC Act’1956 from 2013 to 2014 academic year in the following departments

Pharmacology (MD) 01 (one). Pathology (MD) 01 (one). General Medicine (MD) 02 (two). E.N.T (MS) 01 (one).

Student life

There are a lot of plantations which make the campus a green hub. The present student body has students from all over the country which adds the cosmopolitan flavor to it. There are various activities going on always in the campus which add life to it. The students of TMC organize an annual fest "Neuron" which in itself is a trend-setter for the region. The students also organize blood donation camps.  The students also organize various health awareness camps among the rural population around the college. The students have made remarkable achievements by securing the first and many other positions on a number of occasions in various phases of MBBS examination conducted by the Tripura University.

References

External links
 Official website
 Campus map

Teaching hospitals in India
Medical colleges in Tripura
Education in Agartala
Educational institutions established in 2006
2006 establishments in Tripura
Colleges in Tripura